Ryan James Longman (born 6 November 2000) is an English professional footballer who plays as a midfielder for Championship side Hull City.

Career

Brighton & Hove Albion
Longman made his professional footballing debut on 25 September 2019, coming on as a 58th minute substitute for Aaron Connolly in the 3–1 home loss against fellow Premier League opposition Aston Villa in the EFL Cup third round.

AFC Wimbledon (loan)
On 26 August 2020, Longman signed for League One side AFC Wimbledon on loan for the full 2020–21 season. He made his debut 6 days later starting in the 2–1 EFL Trophy victory over Charlton. Longman made his senior league debut playing 86 minutes in the 2–2 away draw against Northampton on 12 September. He scored his first goal for The Wombles on 19 September in a 4–4 home draw against Plymouth Argyle.

Hull City 
On 7 July 2021, Longman signed a season-long loan deal with Hull City. Longman made his Hull and Championship debut on 14 August, starting but only playing 35 minutes of the eventual 3–0 home loss against Queens Park Rangers. He made his return on 28 August, after picking up an injury on his debut, starting and playing 58 minutes of the 0–0 home draw against Bournemouth. On 27 November, Longman scored his first goal for The Tigers, the winner, in a 2–1 home win against Millwall.
Two weeks later, he scored his second goal in Hull City colours, scoring the opener in the third minute in an eventual 2–2 home draw against Bristol City. Longman curled in a brilliant equaliser in the home FA Cup third round tie against Everton to send the game to extra time, in the eventual 3–2 loss on 8 January 2022. On 31 January 2022, Hull completed the permanent transfer of Longman for an undisclosed fee.

Career statistics

References

2000 births
Living people
English footballers
Association football midfielders
Brighton & Hove Albion F.C. players
AFC Wimbledon players
Hull City A.F.C. players